Narcissus obsoletus is a species of the genus Narcissus (daffodils) in the family Amaryllidaceae. It is classified in Section Serotini. It is native to the Mediterranean littoral from north Africa and the Iberian peninsula, east to Israel.

References

Bibliography 
 World checklist

obsoletus
Garden plants